Ashwellthorpe and Fundenhall is a civil parish in the English county of Norfolk, situated some 6 km south-east of Wymondham and 20 km south-west of Norwich. The parish includes the villages of Ashwellthorpe and Fundenhall, which lie about 1 km apart, although rather farther by road.

The civil parish has an area of 9.74 km2 and in the 2001 census had a population of 756 in 301 households, the population falling to 750 at the 2011 Census. For the purposes of local government, the parish falls within the district of South Norfolk. Fundenhall was a separate parish until it was annexed by Ashwellthorpe in 1935. The combined parish was known as Ashwellthorpe until 2003, when it adopted its current name.

Railway 
Ashwellthorpe had a railway station on the Forncett to Wymondham line; it closed in 1939.

War Memorial
Ashwellthorpe War Memorial lies in All Saint's Churchyard and holds the following names from the First World War:
 Rifleman P. W. Bateman (d.1918), King's Royal Rifle Corps
 Rifleman Leonard M. Bateman (d.1917), 12th Battalion, Rifle Brigade (The Prince Consort's Own)
 Private Albert G. Grimmer (1894-1917), 163rd Company, Machine Gun Corps
 Private Edgar J. Goose (d.1916), 2nd Battalion, Royal Norfolk Regiment
 Private Frederick L. Tubby (1885-1916), 7th Battalion, Royal Norfolk Regiment
 Private E. E. Squires (d.1918), 11th Battalion, Suffolk Regiment
 Private W. R. Squires (1884-1918), 16th (Sussex Yeomanry) Battalion, Royal Sussex Regiment
 H. G. Bateman
 W. J. George
 A. J. Hunt
It also holds the following names from the Second World War:
 Private Eric F. Browne (1920-1943), 6th Battalion, Royal Norfolk Regiment
 Sergeant Ernest T. Goodrum (1922-1944), No. 37 Squadron RAF

References 

 Ordnance Survey (1999). OS Explorer Map 237 - Norwich. .
 Office for National Statistics & Norfolk County Council (2001). Census population and household counts for unparished urban areas and all parishes. Retrieved 2 December 2005.
 Visions of Britain.  Fundenhall CP/AP Norfolk through time. Retrieved 4 November 2005.
 Office of the Deputy Prime Minister (2004). Bulletin of Changes to Local Authority Areas and Names in England. Retrieved 6 December 2005.

External links

Ashwellthorpe
 for Ashwellthorpe.
Information from Genuki Norfolk on Ashwellthorpe.
Fundenhall
 for Fundenhall.
Information from Genuki Norfolk on Fundenhall.
Ashwellthorpe and Fundenhall
Community website for Ashwellthorpe and Fundenhall Local information on Ashwellthorpe and Fundenhall.

Civil parishes in Norfolk